Zheng Qi (also spelled Ching Tsih or Cheng Chi; born Zheng Yaohuang; 1760 – September 1802) was a powerful Chinese pirate operating from Canton (Guangdong) and throughout the South China Sea in the late 1700s.

History
He was born Zheng Yaohuang in Xin'an County, Guangdong, Qing China (modern Shenzhen and Hong Kong), in 1760. He was the seventh son of his pirate father Zheng Lianfu (鄭連福) and his wife Lin Xiu (林秀), hence the nickname Zheng Qi.

Zheng Qi was recruited by the Tay Son dynasty in 1788, and later became one of the most important subordinates under Chen Tianbao. From 1788 to 1799, Zheng frequently attacked the southern coast of Qing China together with Mo Guanfu, Liang Wengeng (梁文庚) and Fan Wencai (樊文才). The Qing navy feared them.

In 1795, Zheng Qi abducted a 12-year-old boy named He Song (何送) and raised him as his adopted son. A few years later, Zheng Qi gave him a captive female as his bride and seven hundred pieces of silver (liang) to set up store for the pirate trade. He would later bestow three ships under He Song's command.

Tay Son army was defeated by his rival the Nguyen lord in 1801, and his three comrades Mo Guanfu, Liang Wengeng and Fan Wencai were captured. Zheng Qi returned to his base in Quảng Ninh and did not want to get involved in the civil war. However, he was later persuaded by Chen Tianbao, heading his troops to Thăng Long (modern Hanoi) to aid the king. He was appointed as the Grand Marshal (Vietnamese: Đại Tư Mã, Han tu: 大司馬) by Nguyễn Quang Toản.

Death
Zheng Qi got involved in the siege of Đồng Hới, and his fleet was defeated in the mouth of Nhật Lệ River by the famous general Nguyễn Văn Trương, he had to flee back to his base area. In September 1802, he was captured and executed by the Nguyen dynasty.

His army descended into chaos after his death, and later, his cousin Zheng Yi succeeded him as the chief.

See also
Pirates of the South China Coast
Zheng Yi
Ching Shih
Cheung Po Tsai

References

Chinese pirates
Tây Sơn dynasty generals
Executed Qing dynasty people
People executed by Vietnam
1760 births
1802 deaths
18th-century pirates